The Ordre des Palmes académiques (French for "Order of Academic Palms") is a national order bestowed by the French Republic on distinguished academics and teachers and for valuable service to universities, education and science. Originally established in 1808 by Emperor Napoleon as a decoration to honour eminent members of the University of Paris, it was changed into its current form as an order of merit on 4 October 1955 by President René Coty, making it one of the oldest civil honours bestowed by the French Republic.

History

Decoration
The original Palmes académiques was instituted by Napoleon on 17 March 1808. In this sense, it shares its origins with the Legion of Honour which Napoleon had established shortly before. Palmes académiques was established to decorate people associated with the university, including high schools. It was not an order as such, but a title of honour identifiable by its insignia sewn on the recipients' costumes. It was bestowed only upon teachers or professors. The original decoration included three classes:
Titulaire – gold palm sewn on white silk;
Officier l'Université – silver palm sewn on white silk;
Officier d'Académie – blue palm sewn on white silk.

The Titulaires were limited to the grand masters of the university, chancellors, treasurers, and councilors for life. The Officiers de l'Université were ordinary councilors, university inspectors, rectors, academy inspectors, deans and faculty professors. The Officiers d'Académie were headmasters, censors, teachers of the two most distinguished classes of high schools, principals of colleges, and, in exceptional cases, high school teachers or college regents. Those working in primary education were ineligible.

On 9 October 1850, the number of classes was reduced to two:
Officier de l'Instruction Publique (Golden Palms);
Officier d'Académie (Silver Palms).

Only those working in education for at least 15 years were eligible. The decoration was conferred by the Minister of Public Instruction on the proposal of rectors after having consulted academic councils.

In 1866, Napoleon III, prompted by Minister of Public Instruction Victor Duruy, widened the scope of the award to include non-teaching persons who had otherwise made contributions to education and culture, including foreigners. It was also made available to French expatriates who made major contributions to learning or education in the wider world.

Order

The present Ordre des Palmes académiques was instituted on 4 October 1955 by President René Coty. In 1963 the French system of orders was reformed under President Charles de Gaulle. A number of so-called "ministerial orders" were consolidated into the Ordre national du Mérite. De Gaulle, however, was fond of the Ordre des Palmes académiques and decided to keep it as a separate order. Since 1955, the Ordre des Palmes académiques has had three grades, each with a fixed annual number of new recipients or promotions:
Commander (Commandeur) – gold palm of 60 mm surmounted by a laurel wreath (couronne) worn on necklet, limited to 280 annually;
Officer (Officier) – gold palm of 55 mm worn on ribbon with rosette on left breast, limited to 1523 annually;
Knight (Chevalier) – silver palm of 50 mm worn on ribbon on left breast, limited to 4547 annually.

The order is conferred for services to the universities, in teaching or in scientific work. It can be conferred on both French citizens, including those residing abroad, and foreigners. The minimum age of conferment is 35 years. Promotion to a higher grade usually requires five years in the lower rank. The order is administered by a council whose president is the Minister of National Education. Decisions on nominations and promotions are proposed by the minister and formally decided by the Prime Minister. Decisions are announced annually on 1 January, New Year's Day and 14 July, Bastille Day. For those not connected to state-sponsored public education, or the Ministry of National Education, the announcements are made on New Year's Day and for all others on Bastille Day. In 2018, the annual quotas were cut by almost half to their present level.

Notable recipients

French recipients

Monique Adolphe
Michel Alaux
Pierre Arpaillange
Lucie Aubrac
Jules Benoit-Lévy
Henri Betti
Françoise Blime-Dutertre
Isabelle Bogelot
Dounia Bouzar
Alexandre Bouzdine
Henri Brocard
Colette Caillat
Bernard Claverie
Jean-Claude Ferrage
Flavien Collet
Yves Coppens
Patrick Cousot
Jean Delaire
Émilie Desjeux
Ferdinand Foch
Claire Gibault
Patrick Louis
Najla Hawly
Germain Marc'hadour
Hélène Miard-Delacroix
Subrata K. Mitra
Marcel Pagnol
Augusta Polifeme
Pierre Louis Rouillard
Henri Rousseau in error 
Roger Taillibert
Pauline Thys
Henriette Tirman
Marie-Pier Ysser
Pascal Divanach
Philippe Zawieja

Foreign recipients

Shi Zhengli, virologist and Director of the Center for Emerging Infectious Diseases, Wuhan Institute of Virology, Chinese Academy of Sciences.
James Platt, Director of the Central Bureau for Educational Visits and Exchanges, London.
Ahmed H. Fahal (2018), Professor of Surgery at the University of Khartoum, who especially in Mycetoma.
Guy Bennett, American writer and translator, Professor at Otis College of Art and Design 
Obilo Ng’ong’o - Kenyan Pedagogist and Thespian from Narkuru
Leo Benardo, American foreign language educator 
Bruno Bernard, Belgian professor and writer on export and business ethics
Mimoza Ceka, teaching assistant of French Language in University of Tetovo, primary school teacher of French language in primary school "LIRIA" - Tetovo, and a collaborator of Alliance Française  and Institut Français in North Macedonia.
Herbert Clemone De Ley Jr, American professor of French at the University of Illinois
Louis Dewis, born Isidore Louis Dewachter in Belgium. Merchant and later a post-impressionist painter, he was honoured for his civic endeavors in the early 1900s
Allan L. Goldstein, American biochemist and co-discoverer of the Thymosins
Jane Robert, American educator and former president of the Federation of Alliances Françaises USA
Erskine Gwynne (1898-1948) American publisher of Paris based Boulevardier paper, 1927-1932
Ralph M. Hester, Professor of French, Stanford University, co-author of Découverte et Création, the most widely used textbook for teaching French in the United States in the 1970s and 1980s. In 2000, Hester launched the Interdisciplinary Institute of French Studies, now the France-Stanford Center for Interdisciplinary Studies, with partner funds from the French Ministry of Foreign Affairs.
John Kneller, English-American professor and fifth President of Brooklyn College
Francis L. Lawrence, American educator and scholar specializing in French literature; classical drama and baroque poetry, President of Rutgers University 1990–2002
Alice Lemieux-Lévesque, Canadian-American writer
Queen 'Masenate Mohato Seeiso of Lesotho (2018)
Ahmad Kamyabi Mask, Iranian littérateur, writer, translator, publisher and Professor Emeritus of Modern Drama and Theater of the Faculty of Fine Arts of the University of Tehran
 Alfred Noe, Austrian historian of Romance studies
Michael D. Oates, PhD, Professor of Modern Languages (French) at the University of Northern Iowa.
Zeus Salazar, Filipino Historian
Léopold Sédar Senghor, Senegalese poet, theoretician of Négritude, first President of Senegal (1960–80), and the first African to be elected as a member of the Académie française
Ali-Akbar Siassi, Iranian intellectual and psychologist who served as the country's Foreign Minister, Minister of Education and Chancellor of the University of Tehran.
Lucijan Marija Škerjanc, Slovene composer, conductor, pianist and musicologist
Javad Tabatabai, Iranian philosopher and political scientist, Professor and Vice-Dean of the Faculty of Law and Political Science at the University of Tehran 
Buddy Wentworth, Namibian deputy education minister, for his contributions to the Namibian independence struggle
Brian Zager, Principal Lafayette Academy, Founder of first Middle School Dual Language French Program in Manhattan; built a successful program of French; Native New Yorkers; through a rigorous curriculum earning the label Franceducation. Principal Zager met with First Lady Briggite Macron in September 2019 to collaborate on and discuss social emotional learning.
Andrea Zitolo, Italian physical-chemist and material scientist
Ganjar Kurnia, Indonesian academist, Rector of Padjadjaran University (2007-2015), Educational and Cultural Attache Embassy of Indonesia, Paris
Abdul Hafeez Mirza, Pakistani educationist, author, tourism worker and cultural activist. Professor of French at University of the Punjab , Forman Christian College , Aitchison College and Alliance Francaise Lahore. Former General Manager at Tourism Development Corporation Punjab.

Insignia
The badge, unchanged since its creation in 1808, consists of a pair of violet-enamelled palm branches. It is suspended from a plain violet ribbon.

References

Further reading

External links

 Association des Membres de l'Ordre des Palmes Académiques 
 France: Order of the Academic Palms Medals of the World

Civil awards and decorations of France
Palmes Academiques
1955 establishments in France
Orders of merit